Tróndur í Gøtu (Icelandic: Þrándur í Götu, Old Norse Þrǫ́ndr í Gǫtu) (c. 945 – 1035) was a Viking era chieftain from the Faroe Islands.

Biography
Tróndur í Gøtu lived at his father's home in the village of Gøta on the island of Eysturoy. Initially Tróndur and his brother Thorlac drew lots to decide who should inherit the estate. After losing, Thorlac went to live in neighbouring islands with his wife. The siblings eventually lived together at Gøta with their children.

Tróndur opposed Christianization of the Faroes and pronounced a curse against the religion and rival chieftain Sigmundur Brestisson who was promulgating it. He and  Sigmundur Brestisson are  central figures in the Færeyinga saga, which tells the early history of the Faroe Islands and the coming of Christianity to the islands. This is also the subject of the  poem "Gandkvæði Tróndar" by the Faroese poet Janus Djurhuus (1881–1948).

Icelandic saying
Færeyinga saga was written in Iceland shortly after 1200. The saga is the oldest recorded source of the history of the Faroe Islands. It is commonly believed to have relied upon oral testimonies from the Faroe Islands. Tróndur í Gøtu himself was probably unknown  to most Icelanders, explaining why the words   þrándur  and  götu  may be commonly lower cased.    Because Tróndur opposed royal taxation,  Icelanders might think that  þrándur literally means an obstacle.

The saying in the Icelandic language, vera einhverjum Þrándur í Götu (e. being someones Þrándur í Götu) or just að [[wikt:vera þrándur í götu|vera þrándur í götu]] (e. to be a þrándur í götu), means  to be an obstacle to somebody.

In popular culture
To present day Faroese Tróndur í Gøtu is considered a national hero. The Faroese music band Týr wrote a song called "Tróndur í Gøtu" in honor of this famous Faroese warrior which was released in 2009 on the album By the Light of the Northern Star.''

References

External links
Blásastova Museum and Tróndur í Gøtu’s Farm

11th-century Faroese people
1035 deaths
940s births
Legendary Norsemen
10th-century Vikings
11th-century Vikings